Kevin Canty (born January 17, 1953) is an American novelist and short story writer.  He is a faculty member in the English department at the University of Montana at Missoula, where he currently resides. Canty received his master's degree in English from the University of Florida in 1990.  He received his M.F.A. in creative writing from the University of Arizona in 1993.

Personal life
Kevin Canty is the brother of the musicians Brendan Canty and James Canty.

Bibliography

Novels
Into the Great Wide Open (1997)
Rounders (1998)
Nine Below Zero (1999)
Winslow in Love (2005)
Everything (2010)
The Underworld (2017)

Short fiction 
•Happy Endings

Collections
A Stranger in This World (1994)
Honeymoon (2001)
Where the Money Went (2009)

List of stories

References 

1953 births
Living people
20th-century American novelists
21st-century American novelists
American male novelists
The New Yorker people
University of Arizona alumni
University of Florida alumni
University of Montana faculty
Writers from Montana
American male short story writers
20th-century American short story writers
21st-century American short story writers
People from Lakeport, California
20th-century American male writers
21st-century American male writers
Novelists from California